Masahiro Ishida (born May 20, 1967, in Nara Prefecture, Japan) is a Japanese politician who has served as a member of the House of Councillors of Japan since 2013. He represents the National proportional representation block and is a member of the Liberal Democratic Party.

References 

Living people
1967 births
Politicians from Nara Prefecture
21st-century Japanese politicians
Members of the House of Councillors (Japan)
Liberal Democratic Party (Japan) politicians
University of Tokyo alumni